The 1994 Supercoppa Italiana was a match played by the 1993–94 Serie A winners Milan and 1993–94 Coppa Italia winners Sampdoria. It took place on 28 August 1994 at the San Siro in Milan, Italy. A.C. Milan won the match 4–3 on penalties to earn their fourth Supercoppa.

Match details

1994
Supercoppa 1994
Supercoppa 1994
Supercoppa Italiana 1994
Supercoppa Italiana